Vltava Labe Media (formerly Vltava-Labe-Press) is a Czech publishing house - the second biggest in the Czech Republic. Since November 2015 it belongs to investment company Penta Investments which acquired it from the German publishing groupe Verlagsgruppe Passau. It was created in 2000 by the merger of a number of companies including publishing companies Labe and Vltava. As well as publishing regional daily newspaper Deník, the company also publishes fortnightly women's lifestyle magazine  and nationwide tabloid . In 2013 VLP bought Sanoma Magazines and merged it with Astrosat - the magazine subsidiary which is from 49% owned by German publisher Bertelsmann. Since November 2015 Michal Klíma became the Chairman and CEO of the company.
The company Vltava Labe Media, Inc. is the legal successor of company Vltava-Labe-Press, Inc., and Astrosat Media, Ltd., two publishing houses operating on the Czech media market, especially in the print media since 1992. Vltava Labe Media became the owner of the publishing house Media Tablet in 2015.

References

External links
 

Publishing companies of the Czech Republic
Mass media in Prague